Westwijk is a tram stop serving the neighborhood of Westwijk in the city of Amstelveen, Netherlands. It is the southern terminus of tram line 25, dubbed the Amsteltram before it received its line number. It opened officially on 13 December 2020, unofficially 4 days earlier on 9 December.

History
Westwijk was earlier the former terminus of metro line 51, a hybrid metro/sneltram (light rail) service, that opened to Westwijk in 2004. Like a metro, the sneltram used high-level platforms. Metro service south of Amsterdam Zuid station was closed in 2019 to lower platforms to accommodate the new low-floor trams for line 25.

When the 2004 extension of metro line 51 was built, it used  of the roadbed of the scrapped BovenkerkUithoorn railway line, one of the former Haarlemmermeer railway lines. The section of the line on which the Westwijk and Sacharovlaan stops sit was opened in 1915 and was in use as a railway line until 1950. The Haarlemmermeer railway's Legmeerpolder station was just south of the Westwijk stop at  J.C. van Hattumweg. Today the dwelling for the station's level crossing guard (baanwachter) exists today on the east side of the tram tracks, north of  J.C. van Hattumweg.

References

External links
GVB website 
Tram stops in Amsterdam
Railway stations opened in 2004